Faloodeh or paloodeh is a traditional Iranian cold dessert similar to a sorbet. It consists of thin vermicelli-sized noodles made from starch in a semi-frozen syrup containing sugar and rose water. Faloodeh is often served with lime juice and sometimes ground pistachios. 

In Iran, faloodeh is sold in ice cream stores and coffee shops in flavors such as pistachio, saffron, rosewater and honey, and can be served alongside bastani sonnati, a traditional Persian ice cream. Faloodeh Shirazi, the version from the city of Shiraz, is particularly well-known.

History 
The Persian word paloodeh is from the verb paloodan which means to refine. Faloodeh is an Arabicized form of paloodeh that appeared after the Arab conquest of Iran, due to a lack of the phoneme  in Standard Arabic. In Arab medieval sources, it was known as Faloothaj for example in Al-Muḥkam wa-al-muḥīt al-aʻẓam.

In the 16th to 18th centuries, the Indo-Persian Mughal kings who ruled South Asia created a cold dessert beverage called falooda, which is a derivative of faloodeh.

The Yunnanese desert Paoluda (泡鲁达) is a derivative of the dessert.

Preparation
A thin batter of starch (from potatoes, arrowroot, maize, or rice) is cooked, then pressed through a sieve producing delicate strings similar to cellophane noodles, that are then chilled in ice water. Afterwards, they are combined with the syrup mixture and rapidly cooled until the syrup is at least half-frozen.

See also

References

Arab cuisine
Confectionery
Frozen desserts
Iranian desserts
Iranian inventions